Prodidominae is a family of spider, sometimes called long-spinneret ground spiders. It was formerly regarded as a subfamily of Gnaphosidae, but was raised to a family in 2022.

Spiders in the family are easily identified by the greatly elongated base of the piriform gland spigots. At least parts of their body are covered with shiny scales or setae. The posterior median eyes are flat and silvery, with a triangular, egg-shaped or irregularly rectangular shape.

Biology
Spiders in the Prodidominae are ground dwellers. Most species are nocturnal and hide during the day in litter, but Myandra species, which are probably mimicking ants, seem to be active during the day. The genus Zimiris is synanthropic and thus found throughout the tropics.

Distribution
Although Theuma walteri was described from Turkmenistan by Eugène Simon, it is suspected that Simon accidentally exchanged its locality with that of Anagraphis pallens (Gnaphosidae); then T. walteri would have been collected in the Cape of Good Hope, while A. pallens is from Turkmenistan.

Genera
Genera included:
 Anagrina Berland, 1920 — Africa
 Austrodomus Lawrence, 1947 — South Africa
 Brasilomma Brescovit, Ferreira & Rheims, 2012
 Caudalia Alayón, 1980 — Cuba
 Chileomma Platnick, Shadab & Sorkin, 2005 — Chile
 Chileuma Platnick, Shadab & Sorkin, 2005 — Chile
 Chilongius Platnick, Shadab & Sorkin, 2005 — Chile
 Cryptoerithus Rainbow, 1915 — Australia
 Eleleis Simon, 1893 — South Africa
 Encoptarthria Main, 1954 — Australia
 Indiani Rodrigues, Cizauskas & Lemos, 2020 — Brazil
 Katumbea Cooke, 1964 — Tanzania
 Lygromma Simon, 1893 — Costa Rica to Brazil, Galapagos
 Lygrommatoides Strand, 1918 — Japan
 Moreno Mello-Leitão, 1940 — Chile, Argentina
 Myandra Simon, 1887 — Australia
 Namundra Platnick & Bird, 2007 — Africa
 Neozimiris Simon, 1903 — USA, Mexico, Panama, Galapagos, Bahamas
 Nomindra Platnick & Baehr, 2006 — Australia
 Nopyllus Ott, 2014 — Brazil
 Oltacloea Mello-Leitão, 1940 — Brazil, Argentina
 Paracymbiomma Rodrigues, Cizauskas & Rheims, 2018
 Plutonodomus Cooke, 1964 — Tanzania
 Prodida Dalmas, 1919 — Philippines, Seychelles
 Prodidomus Hentz, 1847 — Mediterranean, Africa, Australia, Asia, Venezuela, Hawaii
 Purcelliana Cooke, 1964 — South Africa
 Theuma Simon, 1893 — Africa, Turkmenistan?
 Theumella Strand, 1906 — Ethiopia
 Tivodrassus Chamberlin & Ivie, 1936 — Mexico
 Tricongius Simon, 1892 — South America
 Zimirina Dalmas, 1919 — Spain, Algeria, Canary Islands, South Africa
 Zimiris Simon, 1882 — Circumtropical

A 2020 phylogenetic analysis involving 59 species of Prodidominae and 32 outgroup species did not recover Propidominae as monophyletic because Anagrina did not arise within the subfamily. The study re-established Molycriinae (including genera Cryptoerithus, Molycria, Nomindra, Wesmaldra, and Wydundra) as a distinct subfamily in Gnaphosidae, a sister to Prodidominae.

References

Bibliography
 Platnick, N.I. & Penney, D. (2004): A Revision of the Widespread Spider Genus Zimiris (Araneae, Prodidomidae). American Museum Novitates 3450.
 Platnick, Norman I. & Baehr, Barbara C. (2006): A revision of the Australasian ground spiders of the family Prodidomidae (Araneae, Gnaphosoidea). Bulletin of the American Museum of Natural History 298: 1-287. (with keys to subfamilies and genera, and picture)
 Platnick, Norman I. (2008): The world spider catalog, version 8.5. American Museum of Natural History.

External links

 Picture of Molycria flavipes

Gnaphosidae
Spider subfamilies